Half-Caste Act was the common name given to Acts of Parliament passed in Victoria (Aboriginal Protection Act 1886) and Western Australia (Aborigines Protection Act 1886) in 1886. They became the model for legislation to control Aboriginal people throughout Australia - Queensland's Aboriginals Protection and Restriction of the Sale of Opium Act 1897, NSW/ACT's Aboriginal Protection Act 1909, the Northern Territory Aboriginals Act 1910, South Australia's Aborigines Act 1911, and Tasmania's Cape Barren Island Reserve Act 1912.

The various related Acts allowed the seizure of "half-caste" children (i.e., mixed race children) and their forcible removal from their parents. This was theoretically to provide them with better homes than those afforded by typical Aboriginal people, where they could grow up to work as domestic servants, and also for social engineering. "Half-caste" people were distinguished from "full-blood" Aboriginal people.

The removed children are now known as the Stolen Generations.

These Acts were a major impetus for a 1967 referendum question. Some of the controls first created by the Acts remained in place until the early 1970s.

Victoria
The Victorian Half-Caste Act 1886 (in full, an Act to amend an Act entitled "An Act to Provide for the Protection and Management of the Aboriginal Natives of Victoria") was an extension and expansion of the Aboriginal Protection Act 1869 which gave extensive powers over the lives of Aboriginal people in the colony of Victoria to the Board for the Protection of Aborigines, including regulation of residence, employment, custody of children and marriage.

The 1886 Act enabled the expulsion of Aboriginal people of mixed descent ("half-castes") aged from eight to 34 from the Aboriginal reserves. This was intended to incorporate them into mainstream European society. These expulsions separated families and communities, causing distress and leading to protest. The expulsions and other policies led to the decline in the population of the reserves, and for much of their land to be sold or leased to European settlers. By 1926 all Victorian Aboriginal reserves had been closed except for Lake Tyers in Gippsland which had a population of about 250.

Western Australia

The Western Australian Aboriginal Protection Board was established in 1886, with five members and a secretary, all of whom were nominated by the Governor, by the Aborigines Protection Act 1886 (WA), or Half-Caste Act.

The 1886 Act was enacted following the furore over the Fairbairn Report of 1882, which revealed slavery conditions among Aboriginal farm workers,  and the work of Rev. John Gribble. The 1886 Act introduced employment contracts between employers and Aboriginal workers over the age of 14. There was no provision in the 1886 Act for contracts to include wages, but employees were to be provided with "substantial, good and sufficient rations", clothing and blankets. The 1886 Act provided a resident magistrate with the power to indenture 'half-caste' and Aboriginal children from a suitable age until they turned 21. An Aboriginal Protection Board, was also established to prevent the abuses reported earlier, but rather than protect Aborigines, it succeeded mainly in putting them under tighter government control. It was intended to enforce contracts, employment of prisoners and apprenticeships, but there was not sufficient power to enforce clauses in the north, and they were openly flouted. The Act defined as "Aboriginal" "every Aboriginal native of Australia, every Aboriginal half-caste, or child of a half-caste". Governor Frederick Broome insisted that the act contain within it a clause permitting traditional owners to continue hunting on their tribal lands.

The effect of the Act was to give increasing power to the Board over Aboriginal people, rather than setting up a system to punish whites for wrongdoing in relation to Aboriginal people. An Aboriginal Department was set up under the office of the Chief Protector of Aborigines. Nearly half of the Legislative Council voted to amend the Act for contract labour as low as 10, but it was defeated. McKenzie Grant, the member for The North, claimed that child labour of 6 or 7 was a necessary commonplace, as "in this way they gradually become domesticated". The Attorney General Septimus Burt, in debate on the second-reading speech, claimed that contracts were being issued not for current work but to hold Aboriginal people as slaves on stations for potential future work to prevent them from being free to leave.

Aboriginal Protection Boards

Protectors of Aborigines were appointed by the Board under the conditions laid down in the various Acts. In theory, Protectors were empowered to undertake legal proceedings on behalf of Aboriginal people, dictate where Aboriginal people could live or work, and keep all wages earned by employed Aboriginal people.

As the Boards had limited funds, Protectors received very limited remuneration and so a range of people were appointed as local Protectors, including resident magistrates, jail wardens, Justices of the Peace and in some cases ministers of religion, but most were local police inspectors. The minutes of the Board show that they dealt with mostly matters of requests from religious bodies for financial relief and reports from Resident or Police Magistrates pertaining to trials and convictions of Aboriginal people under their jurisdiction.

Aboriginal Protection Boards also issued permits to allow Aboriginal people the right to leave their respective missions and enter mainstream society for a set period of time.

See also
 Aboriginal history of Western Australia
 History of Indigenous Australians
 History of Western Australia
 Indian Act (Canada)
 Stolen Generations
Detraditionalization
Detribalization

References

Online resources
 "Ngankat-Kalo: Aboriginal Education 1901-2001". Victorian Aboriginal Education Association Inc. (VAEAI).
 Mission Voices: The Australian Broadcasting Corporation and Koorie Heritage Trust Inc.

Further reading
 A. Grenfell Price. "Australian Native Policy: A Review". Geographical Review, Vol. 34, No. 3. (July 1944), pp. 476–478. Reviewing:
 Edmund J. B. Foxcroft. Australian Native Policy: Its History, Especially in Victoria
 Paul Hasluck. Black Australians: A Survey of Native Policy in Western Australia, 1829–1897
 Norman B. Tindale. Survey of the Half-Caste Problem in South Australia (The Results of the Harvard-Adelaide Universities Anthropological Expedition, 1938–9)

1886 in law
1880s in Victoria (Australia)
1880s in Western Australia
History of Indigenous Australians
History of Victoria (Australia)
Victoria (Australia) legislation
Western Australia legislation
1886 in Australia
Repealed Australian legislation
Legislation concerning indigenous peoples